Itzehoe station is a railway station in  the town of Itzehoe in the German state of Schleswig-Holstein. It is located on the Marsh Railway, which is electrified from Elmshorn up to this point. It is classified by Deutsche Bahn as a category 3 station.

History 

The first Itzehoe station was located on the southern side of the Stör on land later used by a cement factory.  During the extension of the Marsh Railway to Heide in 1878, the second station was built in the town, including the current station building. At that time, Brückenstrasse  crossed the line over a wooden bridge at the northern end of the station. During the extension of the line through the town to Wilster four level crossings were built, which were abolished in 1931 with the realignment along the current route. With the opening of the new line to Wrist in 1889, these crossings had become more inconvenient. A workshop was probably built at the northern exit from the station during the building of the branch line.
	
The contact wire for the electrification of the line reached Itzehoe on 29 May 1998. But the use of electric rollingstock was only introduced after the intervention of the State of Schleswig-Holstein, which had funded the electrification.

Operations 

Regionalbahn services of Schleswig-Holstein from Hamburg-Altona and Pinneberg via Elmshorn begin and end In Itzehoe. The Nord-Ostsee-Bahn service from Hamburg-Altona to Westerland (Sylt) via Husum makes a stop in Itzehoe, as does the Nord-Ostsee-Bahn (NOB) service to Heide. Deutsche Bahn Intercity trains (IC) also stop in Itzehoe and connect the city directly to Stuttgart, Frankfurt, Göttingen and Dresden or in the opposite direction to Westerland.

Itzehoe station has four platform tracks. The track next to the station building is called track 2 and is used by Regionalbahn services. NOB and IC trains to Westerland stop on track 3.  NOB services to Hamburg-Altona and IC trains to Stuttgart, Frankfurt (am Main), Göttingen and Dresden (Wednesdays and Saturdays only to Berlin Südkreuz) stop on track 4. Track 5 is the starting point for NOB services to Heide. In addition to these tracks, there are sidings for freight trains.

Due to the electrification, most intercity trains coming from the south from Itzehoe are electrically-hauled. At the station, the electric locomotive is swapped for a diesel locomotive for the remaining leg to Westerland. In the opposite direction, the procedure is reversed.

The Itzehoe-Wrist railway operated until 27 September 1975.

Notes

References

External links 

Railway stations in Schleswig-Holstein
Railway stations in Germany opened in 1878
Steinburg